Lola Spradley (born June 28, 1946) is an American politician from Colorado. She served as Speaker of the Colorado House of Representatives from 2003 to 2005, the first woman elected to the position.

Early life
Born Lola Fox in Burlington, Colorado, she was brought up along with her six brothers and sisters on a farm near Raymer, Colorado. She graduated from Fort Morgan High School in 1964 and then had a 29-year career with AT&T, starting as an operator and retiring as an assistant vice president.

Colorado House of Representatives career
In September 1997, a vacancy committee appointed Spradley, who then resided in Beulah, to represent House District 44 (Custer, Fremont, Pueblo, and Teller counties) in the Colorado House of Representatives following the resignation of Larry Schwarz. She was later elected to represent the district in 1998 and re-elected in 2000. Following reapportionment in 2002, she was elected to represent House District 60.

During her time in the Colorado House of Representatives, Spradley, a Republican, held three leadership positions: Assistant Majority Leader, Majority Leader, and Speaker. She also served on the Executive Committee of Legislative Council and on the Legislative Council itself.

Life after the Colorado State House
After serving in the House of Representatives, Spradley and her husband retired to Huerfano County. She  volunteers  on boards and commissions, such as the Huerfano County Historical Society board and the 3rd Judicial District Performance Commission, to which she was appointed by the governor. She also serves on the Huerfano County Economic Development Board of Directors, and in 2018 Spradley was elected to serve on the Board of Directors of the Huerfano County Hospital District, which operates the Spanish Peaks Regional Health Center west of Walsenburg.

See also
List of female speakers of legislatures in the United States

References

1946 births
Living people
Regis University alumni
Women state legislators in Colorado
20th-century American politicians
20th-century American women politicians
21st-century American politicians
21st-century American women politicians
Speakers of the Colorado House of Representatives
Republican Party members of the Colorado House of Representatives
Women legislative speakers